Wolterstorffina parvipalmata is a species of toad in the family Bufonidae. It is found on the western and southern slopes of the Cameroon Range (including Mount Cameroon) and Yaoundé Hills in Cameroon, and on the Obudu Plateau in eastern Nigeria.
Its natural habitat is closed-canopy montane forest near streams and small waterfalls. It is threatened by habitat loss. It occurs in the Cross River National Park.

References

parvipalmata
Frogs of Africa
Amphibians of Cameroon
Amphibians of West Africa
Amphibians described in 1898
Taxa named by Franz Werner
Taxonomy articles created by Polbot